A Transatlantic Free Trade Agreement (TAFTA) is a proposal to create a free-trade agreement covering Europe and North America, on both sides of the Atlantic Ocean. Such proposals have been made since the 1990s. Between 2013 and about 2017 an agreement between the United States and the European Union (EU) was under negotiation - the Transatlantic Trade and Investment Partnership - but it was abandoned. If an agreement is reached and ratified on both sides, it could at least in theory be expanded to include the European Free Trade Association (EFTA). Canada and Mexico both have free trade agreements with both the EU and EFTA.

Current and pending trade agreements between proposed members 
 Comprehensive and Progressive Agreement for Trans-Pacific Partnership (Canada and Mexico along with Australia, Japan, Singapore, New Zealand, Vietnam) - since 2018: The United Kingdom is also attempting to participate since 2021.
 United States–Mexico–Canada Agreement (US, Canada & Mexico) – took effect in 2020
 Canada–European Free Trade Association Free Trade Agreement (Canada & EFTA) – took effect in 2009
 Comprehensive Economic and Trade Agreement (Canada & EU) – substantial parts are provisionally applied since September 2017
 Free Trade Agreement between Mexico and the European Union (Mexico & EU) – took effect in 2000
 Free Trade Agreement between Mexico and the European Free Trade Association (Mexico & EFTA)
 European Economic Area (most of EU & EFTA) – took effect in 1994
 Various bilateral free trade agreements of Switzerland

EU-US trade 
 Transatlantic Economic Council

See also
 Free trade areas in Europe
 List of bilateral free trade agreements

References

External links 

 EU negotiations site
 European Commission, DG Trade - In focus Transatlantic Trade and Investment Partnership (TTIP)
 USTR Transatlantic Trade and Investment Partnership
 The Transatlantic Colossus: Global Contributions to Broaden the Debate on the EU-US Free Trade Agreement A collaborative publication with over 20 articles on the global implications of the TAFTA | TTIP

Transatlantic
United States–European Union relations
Proposed free trade agreements
Treaties entered into by the European Union
Free-trade areas
Canada–European Union relations
Mexico–European Union relations
Transatlantic relations